Pueblo Nuevo is a municipality in the Mexican state of Guanajuato.  Its borders are Salamanca, Irapuato, Valle de Santiago, Abasolo.

Former mayor José Durán González, 67, was ambushed and murdered on September 5, 2017.

References

 Municipio de Pueblo Nuevo (Spanish) at ordenjuridico.gob.mx translated by Google
detailed map of Pueblo Nuevo and neighboring regions

Populated places in Guanajuato
Municipalities of Guanajuato